"Et c'est parti..." is a song recorded by the France-born R&B singer Nâdiya, featuring the English rapper Smartzee. The song was released as the second single off her 2004 second studio album 16/9 in June 2004. It was the first single she released outside of the usual France and Switzerland, and achieved success.

Chart performance
Europe-wide, it's her best-selling single, being the only one that charted in the Netherlands. The single went straight to number one in Belgium, number five in France and number twenty-one in both Switzerland and the Netherlands.

"Et c'est parti..." was certified silver three months after its release by SNEP, for selling over 125,000 copies in France. The single peaked at number thirty (#30) in the 2004 French singles year end chart, eight places behind former single "Parle-moi" (#22).

Track listings
CD single (12:47)
 "Et c'est parti..." (radio edit) — 3:53
 "Space" (album version) — 4:50
 "Parle-moi" (karaoke version) — 4:04

CD maxi (17:41)
 "Et c'est parti..." (radio edit) — 3:53
 "Et c'est parti..." (6Mondini remix) — 4:59
 "Parle-moi" (6Mondini remix) — 5:00
 "Et c'est parti..." (instrumental) — 3:49

 7" maxi
A-side:
 "Et c'est parti..." (6Mondini mix)
 "Et c'est parti..." (tek mix by 6Mondini)
B-side:
 "Et c'est parti..." (radio edit)
 "Et c'est parti..." (instrumental)

 CD single - Promo
 "Et c'est parti..." (radio edit) — 3:53

Versions and remixes
 Album version
 Radio edit
 Instrumental
 6Mondini remix
 Tek mix

Charts

Peak positions

Year-end charts

Certifications

References

2004 singles
Nâdiya songs
Ultratop 50 Singles (Flanders) number-one singles
Songs written by Thierry Gronfier
2004 songs

pt:Et c'est parti...